Raakh is a 2007 Hindi-language feature film directed by Hansal Mehta and produced by IMB Combines, starring Mithun Chakraborty, Sohail Khan, Amrita Arora and Isha Koppikar.

Hansal Mehta directed Woodstock Villa and Dus Kahaniyaan simultaneously.

Plot 
Raakh is an underworld tale of revenge and blood. Romance plays an important part in this movie and ultimately shows good wins over evil.

Cast 
 Mithun Chakraborty as Om Narayan / Dada
 Sohail Khan as Karan
 Amrita Arora as Nalini
 Isha Koppikar as Nandini Sujit Roy
 Aditya Srivastava as Yusuf
 Aamir Ali as Krish
 Rajeev Ranjan

References

External links 
 

2010s Hindi-language films
2010 films
Indian crime films
2010 crime films
Hindi-language crime films